Dhaka Shishu (Children) Hospital is a children's hospital in Bangladesh, located in the capital city of Dhaka.

History
The hospital was established in 1972, immediately following independence. It was funded by the late Professor Tofayel Ahmed, the Bangladesh Government, Save the Children Fund of the UK and World Vision of Bangladesh.
The hospital publishes the Dhaka Shishu (Children) Hospital Journal.

Funding and resources
The hospital is administered by a management board appointed by the Ministry of Health & Family Welfare. The Ministry provides 50% of total annual funding, and the remainder is funded by payment for services, individual donations and grants.  The Dhaka Shishu Hospital Trust, created by two public lotteries as well as donations, provides additional financial support when necessary.

The average occupancy rate in 1999 was about 90%.By 2017, the capacity had risen to 650 beds and as of 2020 it was the largest children's hospital in Bangladesh.

Milestones 
 Establishment of Gazipur & Rajshahi Shishu Hospital
 Three classrooms established
 Nine-story expansion project (started 28 November 2010)
 Pediatric Cardiac Center (including a cardiac surgery operating theatre, catheterization lab, recovery room and cardiac ICU) inaugurated by Prime Minister Sheikh Hasina (17 January 2012)

References

External links

Hospital buildings completed in 1972
Hospitals in Dhaka
Hospitals in Bangladesh
Hospitals established in 1972
1973 establishments in Bangladesh
Children's hospitals